Francis Cuffe ( – 26 December 1694) was an Irish  politician.

Cuffe was educated at Trinity College, Dublin. He sat in the House of Commons of Ireland from 1692 to 1693, as a Member of Parliament for Mayo. He was also elected in 1692 for Longford Borough, but chose to sit for Mayo.

He was the son of Sir James Cuffe (died 1678) and Alice Aungier. Some time between 1682 and 1687 he married Honora Boyle, daughter of Rev. Michael Boyle, Archbishop of Armagh,  and his second wife Mary O'Brien, and widow of the 3rd Earl of Ardglass. Their children included Michael Cuffe.

References 

 

1654 births
Year of birth uncertain
1694 deaths
Irish MPs 1692–1693
Members of the Parliament of Ireland (pre-1801) for County Mayo constituencies
Alumni of Trinity College Dublin